"Reuniunea" is a special episode of the talent show Vocea României, produced as a form of reunion due to the inability to film season 10 in 2020 due to the COVID-19 pandemic that aired December 1, 2020. The special featured all of the show's coaches so far (except for Loredana Groza, who is currently under a contract with the rival television, Antena 1) and some of the contestants and winners.

Cast

Coaches
 Andra
 Pavel Bartoș
 Horia Brenciu
 Tudor Chirilă
 Adrian Despot
 Marius Moga
 Irina Rimes
 Smiley

Performances

References 

Pro TV
Pro TV original programming
2020 television episodes
2020 television specials